Perfil is an Argentine weekly newspaper based in Buenos Aires and refounded in 2005.

History 
The newspaper was first launched by Jorge Fontevecchia on 9 May 1998 as a daily newspaper, but poor sales forced its closure on 31 July of the same year.

Perfil was relaunched on 11 September 2005 as a weekly newspaper, published on the day of highest sales, Sundays. The expectation was that after building a reader base they would be able to add a new edition on Saturdays, and finally become a daily newspaper again.

It is currently published on weekends, and has an online edition which is updated every day. In addition, the Sunday edition includes the women's magazine Luz.

Features 
Like many European newspapers it includes a section called the "Reader's Ombudsman", with the responsibility of maintaining the newspaper's reputation. Abel González was the first ombudsman in 1998. From 2005 until 15 December 2007, the journalist and neurologist Nelson Castro held that position. Andrew Graham-Yooll, formerly the chief editor of the Buenos Aires Herald, later became the ombudsman.

Editorial line 
Perfil'''s slogan is Periodismo puro (Spanish: "pure journalism"). Jorge Fontevecchia said that "Pure or technical journalism is always critical, like American 'watchdog' journalism". Despite the implication of total objectivity, the newspaper is strongly critical of the national government. Many of the articles, both in the printed edition and on the website, focus on critics of the government and of President Cristina Fernández.

Editorial Perfil is one of a number of publishing companies which do not receive any official governmental advertisements. It has claimed that the official distribution of advertising monies is "discriminatory" and a "method of persecution and exclusion" of critical media.Perfil criticizes its competing newspapers Clarín and La Nación for their design changes that fail to disguise unchangeable positions.

Buenos Aires TimesPerfil produces the English-language Buenos Aires Times, online and distributed with Perfil on Saturdays. The editor-in-chief  was James Grainger.

Until 2017 a long-established English-language newspaper, the Buenos Aires Herald'' had been published.

References

External links 
Perfil 
Editorial Perfil's Noticias magazine 
Luz magazine 

1998 establishments in Argentina
Daily newspapers published in Argentina
Spanish-language newspapers
Newspapers established in 1998
Mass media in Buenos Aires
Argentine_news_websites
Weekly newspapers published in Argentina